Luka Šušnjara (born 4 April 1997) is a Slovenian professional footballer who plays as a winger for Tabor Sežana.

Club career
Šušnjara made his professional debut with Celje in a 4–0 loss to Domžale on 23 July 2017. In August 2020, Šušnjara moved to Chambly.

On 26 January 2021, Šušnjara signed with Wisła Płock. He left the club by mutual consent on 9 November 2021.

International career
Šušnjara was capped for all Slovenian youth selections from under-16 to under-21.

References

External links

1997 births
Living people
Footballers from Ljubljana
Slovenian footballers
Slovenia youth international footballers
Slovenia under-21 international footballers
Association football wingers
NK Dob players
NK Celje players
NŠ Mura players
FC Chambly Oise players
Wisła Płock players
FC Koper players
NK Tabor Sežana players
Slovenian Second League players
Slovenian PrvaLiga players
Ligue 2 players
Ekstraklasa players
Slovenian expatriate footballers
Slovenian expatriate sportspeople in Italy
Slovenian expatriate sportspeople in France
Slovenian expatriate sportspeople in Poland
Expatriate footballers in Italy
Expatriate footballers in France
Expatriate footballers in Poland